Randy Gambill is an American film and television actor.

Career
Gambill made his acting début as The Gentle Warrior in the low-budget, comedy film Foot Fist Way (2006) directed by Jody Hill; he also served as the film's production designer.  He went on to appear as the Pervert in the black-comedy film Observe and Report (2009), also directed by Hill.

Gambill has also made appearances in two episodes (2009) of Eastbound & Down, a situation-comedy television series, and the 2012 film Richard's Wedding by Onur Tukel.

Film and television work

References

External links

Year of birth missing (living people)
American male film actors
American male television actors
Living people